Aneta Michalak-Białkowska (born 6 August 1977 in Poznań) is a Polish sprint canoeist who competed from 1999 to 2005. She won seven medals at the ICF Canoe Sprint World Championships with a gold (K-4 1000 m: 2002), three silvers (K-4 500 m: 2003, 2005); (K-4 1000 m: 2001) and three bronzes (K-2 1000 m: 2005, K-4 200 m: 1999, K-4 500 m: 1999).

Michalak-Białkowska also competed in two Summer Olympics, earning her best finish of fourth on two occasions (K-4 500 m: 2000, K-4 500 m: 2004).

References

1977 births
Canoeists at the 2000 Summer Olympics
Canoeists at the 2004 Summer Olympics
Living people
Olympic canoeists of Poland
Polish female canoeists
Sportspeople from Poznań
ICF Canoe Sprint World Championships medalists in kayak